The House of the Seven Gables built in the 1880s is an historic octagonal house located on the corner of Clark and Bloxham streets, North West, in Mayo, Florida, USA. After reading The House of the Seven Gables by Nathaniel Hawthorne, James Mitchell designed this house and had it built by Mack Koon. Seven of the eight sides are gabled, while the eighth side opens into a rear wing. As built, the house had three bedrooms and a parlor in the octagon section and cooking and dining areas in the wing. Dr. Charles Hailey of the University of Florida cites it as an example of the adaptation of "Florida 's small-town vernacular structures, 'minor monuments'", which are worthy of research.

In 1989, it was listed in A Guide to Florida's Historic Architecture prepared by the Florida Association of the American Institute of Architects and published by the University of Florida Press.

Recently, a storm nearly demolished the house. No plans are known for any restoration and the house, which had appeared to be beyond repair, has since been dismantled and the lot cleared.

Gallery

See also
 List of octagon houses
 House of the Seven Gables in Salem, Massachusetts

References

External links

 Robert Kline, compiler, Octagon houses in Florida: Lafayette County, Mayo, has an image and an aerial

Octagon houses in Florida
Buildings and structures in Lafayette County, Florida
1880s establishments in Florida